Jaganmata, also rendered as Lokamata, is primarily an epithet of the Hindu goddess Lakshmi, the supreme goddess of Vaishnavism. It is also used in Hindu literature to address other goddesses, such as Parvati and Durga.

Literature

Atharva Veda 
A hymn from the Atharva Veda dedicated to Lakshmi prays for a portion of the Jaganmata to reside upon one's tongue.

Vishnu Purana 
The Vishnu Purana extols Lakshmi as Jaganmata:

According to this text, since Vishnu is omnipresent, and Lakshmi is regarded to be his divine shakti, she serves him as the mother of the universe that is under his protection.

Bhagavata Purana 
The Bhagavata Purana features a description of Vishnu's form in the form of a prayer, where it describes Lakshmi, the universal mother, tending to the feet of her eternal consort.

Lakshmi Tantra 
In the Lakshmi Tantra, Indra performs a penance for two millennia to meet Lakshmi, and she appears before him upon a lotus, described to be the supreme mother of the universe.

See also
Jagdamba
Padmavathi
Ishvari
Bhargavi

References

Hindu goddesses
Lakshmi
Vaishnavism
Hinduism